The contryphans (conus + tryptophan) are a family of peptides that are active constituents of the potent venom produced by cone snail (genus Conus).  The two amino acid cysteine residues in contryphans are linked by a disulfide bond.  In addition, contryphans undergo an unusual degree of post-translational modification including 
epimerization of leucine and tryptophan, tryptophan bromination, amidation of the C-terminus, and proline hydroxylation. In the broader scheme of genetic conotoxin classification, contryphans are members of "Conotoxin Superfamily O2."

Family members

Contryphan family members include:

 
where the sequence abbreviations stand for:
 O = 4-trans-hydroxyproline,
 l = D-leucine, L = L-leucine,
 w = D-tryptophan, W = L-tryptophan,
 γ = gamma-carboxyglutamic acid,
 NH2 = C-terminal amidation
and the remainder of the letters refer to the standard one letter abbreviations for amino acids.

Mechanism of toxicity

The venom of cone snails cause paralysis of their fish prey.  The molecular target has not been determined for all contryphan peptides, however it is known that contryphan-Vn is a Ca2+-dependent K+ channel modulator, while glacontryphan-M is a L-type calcium channel blocker.

References

External links 
 

Neurotoxins
Ion channel toxins
Snail toxins